Riverside Mall may refer to these shopping malls:

 Main Street Pedestrian Mall (Riverside, California)
 Riverside Mall (Mbombela), in Mpumalanga, South Africa
 Riverside Mall (Rondebosch), in Cape Metropole, South Africa
 Riverside Mall (Utica, New York), formerly operated by The Pyramid Companies

See also 
 Riverside Square Mall, in Hackensack, New Jersey
 North Riverside Park Mall, in North Riverside, Illinois